Landia station is a closed rail station on the Long Island Rail Road's Port Jefferson Branch in the Locust Grove section of Syosset, New York.

History 
The station was opened on December 15, 1952 for the Fairchild Camera & Instrument Corporation, which had recently moved from Queens to Syosset.  Its purpose was to provide transportation to work for Fairchild employees who still lived in Queens and did not own automobiles. Service to the station was halted on June 26, 1972 as the station did not have high-level platforms to accommodate the new M1 cars which did not have stairs to grade-level. In 1970, ridership at the station consisted of two daily passengers. On October 3, 1973, the station closed permanently. Reopening the station has been proposed as a solution to the gap problem at Syosset as it is on a straight portion of track compared to the curved section at Syosset.

References

External links
1971 Fan Trip image (TrainsAreFun.com)

Former Long Island Rail Road stations in Nassau County, New York
Railway stations in the United States opened in 1952
Railway stations closed in 1973
1952 establishments in New York (state)
1973 disestablishments in New York (state)